Awake Zion is a 2005 documentary by Monica Haim that documents the connection between Jews and Rastafarians.

Synopsis

In Awake Zion, Haim travels from Manhattan to Jamaica and Israel, interviewing Rastafarians and Rabbis to highlight similarities between their worldviews. Haim, a young Jewish woman, says she first perceived a connection between Jews and Rastafarians at a reggae concert.

Haim interviews Super Dane, an African American DJ in the reggae scene in Brooklyn who is shocked by Matisyahu, a Hasidic reggae artist from White Plains New York. The film also features Jamaican-born Israeli rapper Yehoshua Sofer.

Response
Most reviews of Awake Zion emphasize the documentary's social conscience in trying to bridge a gap between two seemingly different cultures. Rather than being scholarly, Haim's tone is described as "gently irreverent".

See also
History of the Jews in Jamaica
History of the Jews in Morocco
History of the Jews in South Africa

References

External links
The Cinema Guide
Awake Zions website
Review of Awake Zion
Programa Radial de Reggae y Cultura de Jamaica

Jamaican documentary films
2005 films
Films about music and musicians
Documentary films about Jews and Judaism
Documentary films about religion
Rastafari
2000s Hebrew-language films
2005 documentary films
2000s English-language films
2005 multilingual films